The Tasmanian Symphony Orchestra (TSO) is a symphony orchestra based in Hobart, Tasmania, Australia. It is the smallest of the six orchestras established by the Australian Broadcasting Corporation (ABC).

History

The Tasmanian Symphony Orchestra was established in 1948, and gave its first concert on 25 May in the Hobart Town Hall, conducted by Joseph Post. The soloist was the Tasmanian-born pianist Eileen Joyce, who performed the Piano Concerto in A minor by Edvard Grieg.

From 1973 to 1998 its home was the Odeon Theatre, a renovated former cinema built in 1916 as a replica of New York's Strand Theater.  It has now moved to the Federation Concert Hall. In 1998, a 50th anniversary concert was held in the original venue, the Town Hall, under its then chief conductor David Porcelijn.

The TSO was the first Australian orchestra to have its own radio program, Journey into Melody, which was broadcast weekly from 1956 to 1969.

By the late 1960s, there were far more subscribers per head of the state population (1 in 144) than in any of the other capital-city based ABC orchestras. In 1995, when funding cuts threatened to downsize the orchestra from 47 players, a petition was launched by the Friends of the TSO that gathered 35,000 signatures, the largest petition in Tasmanian history.

In 1998, A Taste of the Tasmanian Symphony Orchestra was published. This was a cookbook that included recipes contributed by members of the orchestra, guest conductors and visiting artists. It sold far more than anticipated, including healthy sales on the Australian mainland.

It receives government funding from both the Tasmanian and Australian governments. The orchestra performs at a number of concert venues both in Tasmania and interstate, including Federation Concert Hall, Tolosa Park in Glenorchy, Princess Theatre and Albert Hall both in Launceston, Burnie Town Hall, Devonport Entertainment Centre, Wrest Point Entertainment Centre in Sandy Bay and the City Recital Hall in Sydney. Major sponsors of the orchestra include Hydro Tasmania, Bass and Equitable Building Society and the Hobart City Council.

Amongst the orchestra's recordings are the complete works of Ignaz Moscheles for piano and orchestra, for which the soloist and conductor was Howard Shelley.

The TSO has toured to Israel, Greece, South Korea, Indonesia, Argentina, United States, Canada, China and Japan as well as widely throughout Australia. It won the 1996 Sidney Myer Performing Arts Award, and a documentary on Maurice Ravel's Mother Goose, which featured the TSO, won the Best Biography Profile at the New York Festival International Television Programming Awards.

With Trisha Crowe, Michael Falzon, Amanda Harrison, Lucy Maunder, Andy Conaghan, Jacqueline Dark and Toni Lamond, the TSO recorded I Dreamed a Dream: The Hit Songs from Broadway for ABC Classics, which was released on 21 June 2013. Falzon and Crowe joined TSO and conductor Guy Noble for TSO Goes to Broadway on 20 (Hobart) and 22 (Launceston) June 2013. to coincide with the launch of the album.

Chief conductors

 Kenneth Murison Bourn (1962)
 Thomas Matthews (1962–1968)
 Thomas Mayer (1970–1974)
 Vanco Cavdarski (1974–1980)
 Barry Tuckwell (1980–1983)
 Geoffrey Lancaster
 Nicholas Braithwaite
 Dobbs Franks (1989–1991)
 David Porcelijn
  (2001–2003)
 Sebastian Lang-Lessing (2004–2011)
 Marko Letonja (2012–2020)
 Eivind Aadland (2020–present)

Concertmasters

 Lionel Hickey (1948–1962)
 Leon La Gruta
 Wilfred Jones
 William Hennessy
 Barbara Jane Gilby
 Jun Yi Ma
 Emma McGrath

Charting albums

Awards and nominations

APRA-AMC Classical Music Awards
The APRA-AMC Classical Music Awards are presented annually by Australasian Performing Right Association (APRA) and Australian Music Centre (AMC).

|-
|rowspan="2"| 2005 || Concerto for Guitar and Strings (Ross Edwards) – Karin Schaupp, Tasmanian Symphony Orchestra, Richard Mills (conductor) || Orchestral Work of the Year || 
|-
| Australian Music Program 2004 – Tasmanian Symphony Orchestra || Outstanding Contribution by an Organisation || 
|-
|rowspan="3"| 2006 || Blue Rags (Ian Munro) – Tasmanian Symphony Orchestra || Orchestral Work of the Year || 
|-
| Cello Dreaming Orchestral Version (Peter Sculthorpe) – Tasmanian Symphony Orchestra || Orchestral Work of the Year || 
|-
| Quamby (Peter Sculthorpe) – Tasmanian Symphony Orchestra || Orchestral Work of the Year || 
|-
|rowspan="2"| 2007 || Tivoli Dances (Graeme Koehne) – Tasmanian Symphony Orchestra, Arvo Volmer (conductor) || Orchestral Work of the Year || 
|-
| Australian Composers' School – Tasmanian Symphony Orchestra || Outstanding Contribution to Australian Music in Education || 
|-
| 2008 || Cantilena Pacifica (Richard Meale) – Tasmanian Symphony Orchestra, Erica Kennedy (violin), Richard Mills (conductor) || Orchestral Work of the Year || 
|-
|rowspan="3"| 2009 || Tivoli Dances (Graeme Koehne) – Tasmanian Symphony Orchestra, Richard Mills (conductor) || Orchestral Work of the Year || 
|-
| Palm Court Suite (Graeme Koehne) – Tasmanian Symphony Orchestra, Richard Mills (conductor) || Orchestral Work of the Year || 
|-
| TSO Australian Composers' School – Tasmanian Symphony Orchestra || Outstanding Contribution to Australian Music in Education ||

ARIA Music Awards
The ARIA Music Awards is an annual awards ceremony that recognises excellence, innovation, and achievement across all genres of Australian music. They commenced in 1987. 

! 
|-
| 1990
| Vivaldi: The Four Seasons
|rowspan="2" |Best Classical Album
| 
|rowspan="2" | 
|-
| 1997
| Peter Sculthorpe: The Fifth Continent (with David Porcelijn) 
| 
|-
| 2002
|  Symphony of Lullabies (with Sean O'Boyle) 
| Best Children's Album
| 
|
|-
| 2003
| Mozart Arias (with Niki Vasilakis & Teddy Tahu Rhodes)
|rowspan="5" |Best Classical Album
| 
|rowspan="5" | 
|-
| 2006
| Mendelssohn, Bruch, Ravel (with Niki Vasilakis & Sebastian Lang-Lessing) 
| 
|-
| 2008
| Baroque Guitar Concertos (with Slava Grigoryan & Benjamin Northey) 
| 
|-
| 2014
| Mozart Arias (with Emma Matthews & Marko Letonja) 
| 
|-
| 2018
| Into Silence: Pärt, Vasks, Górecki, Pelecis (with Tamara-Anna Cislowska & Johannes Fritzsch) 
| 
|-

See also
Symphony Australia
IHOS Music Theatre and Opera

Notes

Further reading
Catherine Hocking, Feature on the TSO, ABC Radio 24 Hours magazine, April 1998

External links
 
 Sebastian Lang-Lessing

1948 establishments in Australia
APRA Award winners
Australian orchestras
Musical groups established in 1948
Organisations based in Tasmania
Symphony orchestras
Tourist attractions in Hobart